Euphoria is an American teen drama television series created by Sam Levinson, which centres on a group of dysfunctional high school students at East Highland High School. The show premiered on June 16, 2019, on HBO.

Appearances
 Key

Main characters

Ruby "Rue" Bennett
 played by Zendaya
Janice LeAnn Brown (4 years old, "Pilot" and "And Salt the Earth Behind You")
McKenna Rae Roberts (10 years old, "Pilot")
Aliyah Conley (13 years old, "'03 Bonnie and Clyde")
Alumière Glass (3 years old, "Stand Still Like the Hummingbird")
Rue was born on September 14, 2001, 3 days after 9/11. She is a recovering teenage drug addict who is fresh out of rehab and struggling to find her place in the world. Sarcastic and introverted, she serves as the narrator for the series.  She lives with her mom and sister.  Her dad passed away from cancer before the start of the series.  She is best friends with Lexi, having known her since preschool. The plot of the first season mainly revolves around her relationship with Jules. The second season finds her continuing to struggle with addiction as she becomes involved with drug trafficking, and enters an official relationship with Jules.

Alexandra "Lexi" Howard
 played by Maude Apatow
Lexi was born on January 11, 2001. She is Rue's childhood best friend, and Cassie's younger sister. She spends most of her teenage years in the shadow of her big sister, always feeling like an outsider and an observer of her own life.

Determined to do more and to finally step into the spotlight, she creates a play in Season 2 and bases it on everything that has happened around her. At the same time, she grows closer to Fezco after discovering an unexpected compatibility, including some unusual shared interests (such as the 1986 film Stand by Me).

Lexi mentions that her (and Cassie's) mother is Jewish. (Season 2, Episode 1)

Fezco
 played by Angus Cloud
Mason Shea Joyce (10 years old, "Trying to Get to Heaven Before They Close the Door")
Fez is a local drug dealer with a close, sibling-like relationship with Rue.  He was raised by his grandmother who is now invalid.  He lives with Ashtray, whom he considers his business partner, and even though they do not appear to be related, he treats him like a brother. He starts a camaraderie (with romantic undertones) with Lexi in Season 2.

Cal Jacobs
 played by Eric Dane
 Elias Kacavas (18 years old, "Ruminations: Big and Little Bullys")
Cal is Nate's strict, demanding father with a double life. He is married to and fathers three children with Marsha, his high school girlfriend (one of whom is unnamed). However, he has one-night stands with men and transgender youths, which he records with a hidden camera. He leaves his family and gets arrested in Season 2.

Madeleine "Maddy" Perez
 played by Alexa Demie 
 Keilani Arellanes (11 years old, "Made You Look", "’03 Bonnie and Clyde", and "Out of Touch")
Confident, combative and popular, Maddy is Nate's on-and-off girlfriend and later ex-girlfriend. She has a turbulent relationship with her family and was frequently emotionally and sometimes physically abused by Nate while they were together. Her biggest fear is ending up in a relationship like her parents' loveless one, so she often excuses Nate's acts of violence as proof of his passion for her. Despite her hotheadedness, she is kind and values her close friends, like Kat and BB, as well as Rue, Jules and Lexi. Cassie was once her best friend, before she betrayed her by having a secret fling with Nate in the second season.

Nathaniel "Nate" Jacobs
 played by Jacob Elordi
 Gabriel Golub (11 years old, "Stuntin' Like My Daddy")
Nate is a high school athlete whose anger issues mask his sexual insecurities. Viewing his father's pornography collection at a young age left him traumatized. He has harbored an unspecified fixation on Jules. He has an on-off and toxic relationship with Maddy during season 1, and he starts a secret relationship with Cassie, which damages the girls' friendship, in season 2.

Nate often has dangerous outbursts of anger and violence, of which Maddy is usually on the receiving end, such as when he chokes her in season 1 and threatens her with a gun in season 2.

Katherine "Kat" Hernandez
 played by Barbie Ferreira
 Johanna Colón (11 years old, "Made You Look")
Kat was born on August 15, 2002. She is a girl fighting for body positivity while exploring her sexuality. She is a plus-sized teenage girl with chin-length hair, ivory skin, and dark brown eyes. At the beginning of the first season, she wears cat-eye glasses and her everyday clothes often consist of average shirts, tops, and dresses, preferring minimalist makeup looks.

Leslie Bennett
 played by Nika King
 Malia Barnhardt (14 years old, "A Thousand Little Trees of Blood")
Leslie is Rue and Gia's mother. After losing her husband, Leslie takes care of her children on her own.

Georgia "Gia" Bennett
 played by Storm Reid
Hyla Rayne Fontenot (7 years old, "Pilot")
Nyran Hepburn and Ashton Hunsberger (Baby Gia, "Stand Still Like the Hummingbird")
Gia was born in late 2005 and is Rue's caring and loyal younger sister. The summer before Rue's junior year, Gia found her overdosing and choking on a pool of vomit, which traumatized her.

Jules Vaughn
 played by Hunter Schafer
Clark Furlong (11 years old, "Shook Ones Pt. II")
Jules is a transgender girl who enters into a turbulent relationship with Rue after moving into town. She has a strained relationship with her mother, who placed her in a psychiatric hospital against her will when she was 11. Free-spirited and kind, as well as emotional and impulsive, she often finds herself bearing the weight of Rue's addiction. In the second season, she cheats on Rue with Elliot.

Christopher "Chris" McKay
 played by Algee Smith
Yohance & Zakai Biagas-Bey (11 years old, "The Next Episode")
McKay is a young football player and Cassie's ex-boyfriend who is having difficulties adjusting to college. He is hazed by his fraternity brothers at a party and ends up getting Cassie pregnant which leads to her having an abortion.

Cassandra "Cassie" Howard
 played by Sydney Sweeney
Kyra Adler (11 years old, "The Trials and Tribulations of Trying to Pee While Depressed")
Cassie is a sweet and popular girl who enjoys ice skating and is Lexi's older sister. Facing objectification from a young age, as well as her father leaving her family, has left the need for male validation as her Achilles' heel. She has had multiple past relationships which often ended in revenge porn of her being spread. 

In the first season she enters a relationship with McKay, who she later breaks up with following an abortion. Seeking comfort, she has a secret fling with Nate in the second season, causing her to lose her sense of self and ruining her friendship with Maddy. 

Her sister Lexi mentions that their mother is Jewish. (Season 2, Episode 1)

Ali
 played by Colman Domingo ("Trouble Don't Last Always"; recurring season 1–2)
Ali is a man in recovery from substance use disorder who often speaks at Rue's Narcotics Anonymous meetings and eventually becomes her sponsor.

Ashtray
 played by Javon "Wanna" Walton (season 2; co-starring season 1)
Daelo Jin Walton (6 years old, "Trying to Get to Heaven Before They Close the Door")
Ashtray is Fez's "little brother" and a drug dealer.
He is a recurring character throughout season 1 but becomes a main character in season 2. He is killed after being shot in the head by a SWAT team member during a police raid at the house he shares with Fez.

Ethan Daley
 played by Austin Abrams (season 2; recurring season 1)
Ethan is Kat's love interest who becomes her boyfriend.

Elliot
 played by Dominic Fike (season 2)
Elliot is a classmate and new friend of Rue's, who comes between her and Jules. He is also a musician.

Supporting characters

Recurring guest stars
 Suze Howard, played by Alanna Ubach, Lexi and Cassie's mother. Her younger daughter Lexi mentions that her mother Suze is Jewish, during the first episode of the second season. She and Gus, her ex-husband, separated the night before Cassie started ninth grade. Although Suze allowed Gus to see their daughters on weekends, he visited less and less over time and eventually stopped visiting altogether. Despite being almost constantly inebriated, she acts as a loving and supportive mother.
 Tyler Clarkson, played by Lukas Gage, a college student who is brutally attacked by Nate for having sex with Maddy at a party (season 1).
 David Vaughn, played by John Ales, Jules' father.
 Daniel, played by Keean Johnson and Isaac Arellanes (11 years old, "Made You Look"), a junior who dated Kat in sixth grade and later tries to hook up with Cassie (season 1).
 Marsha Jacobs, played by Paula Marshall and Rebecca Louise (17 years old, "Ruminations: Big and Little Bullys"), Nate and Aaron’s mother and Cal’s wife.
 Aaron Jacobs, played by Zak Steiner, Nate's older brother who is considered a "fuck-up" by his father and brother.
 Kat's mom, played by Mercedes Colon (season 1).
 Custer, played by Tyler Chase, assistant to Mouse, Fez's supplier (seasons 1-2).
 Robert Bennett, played by Bruce Wexler, Rue's father, seen in flashbacks, died from cancer when Rue was 13.
 Gus Howard, played by Nick Blood, Lexi and Cassie's father, seen in flashbacks, a painkiller addict who is estranged from the family.
 Laurie, played by Martha Kelly, former school teacher turned drug dealer. Unlike her employees, Laurie is calm and soft-spoken, however she claims to be ruthless when it comes to making her money back. She is addicted to OxyContin and it is implied that her addiction had forced her into prostitution in order to earn money for drugs to avoid withdrawal (season 2).
 Samantha, played by Minka Kelly, Maddy’s employer at her new babysitting job (season 2).

Co-stars
 Troy and Roy McKay, played by Tyler Timmons and Tristan Timmons, McKay's younger twin brothers who got Gia involved with drugs (season 1).
 Barbara "BB" Brooks, played by Sophia Rose Wilson, a friend of Maddy, Kat, Cassie, and Lexi. She is known by fans as "vape girl" due to her excessive nicotine usage. She is prone to gossip and excites drama as shown when she persuades Maddy to beat up Cassie.
 Ted Perez, played by Ruben Dario, Maddy's alcoholic father (season 1).
 Mouse, played by Meeko, Fez's supplier (seasons 1–2).
 Miss Marsha, played by Marsha Gambles, server at the diner Frank's
 Fezco's grandmother, played by Brynda Mattox and Kathrine Narducci ("Trying to Get to Heaven Before They Close the Door"), who he looks after as she is bed-ridden.
 Faye, played by Chloe Cherry, Custer's girlfriend, who stays with Fezco and Ashtray after she’s wanted by the police for pushing her superintendent off the motel balcony. She is initially presented as a somewhat self-centred airhead who is rude towards Rue after she expresses discomfort over doing heroin, however later in the series she is shown to be kinder and forms a friendship with Fez. After learning her boyfriend is cooperating with the police against Fez, she is conflicted due to her split loyalties. Shortly before the police raid Fez's apartment, Faye signals to Fez to warn him that Custer may be recording the conversation (season 2).
 Bruce, played by Melvin “Bonez” Estes, Laurie’s right-hand man (season 2).
 Theo, played by Yukon Clement, Samantha’s child that Maddy babysits (season 2).
 Sebastian, played by Fernando Belo, Theo’s father and Samantha’s husband (season 2).
 Bobbi, played by Veronica Taylor, an acquaintance of Lexi's, who helps develop her play. In her first appearance, Bobbi assists Lexi in the casting of her play and later on in the season, during Lexi's play, she acts as Lexi's right-hand man. Following Cassie's interruption of the play, Bobbi comforts Lexi and convinces her to carry on by claiming that the play isn't boring and that in the history of East Highland High School, no other play has incurred a riot (season 2).
 Caleb, played by Ansel Pierce, a student at East Highland High School. He is first seen using the toilet while Cassie is hiding from Maddy in the bath and is later seen in the audience of Lexi's play (season 2).
 Leslie’s mother, played by Gwen Mukes, appears in flashbacks at Robert’s eulogy (season 2).

Guest stars
 Principal Hayes, played by Jeremiah Birkett, principal of East Highland High School, appears in episodes "Stuntin' Like My Daddy" and "'03 Bonnie and Clyde".
 Trevor, played by Shiloh Fernandez, a store clerk at Femme to whom Kat develops an attraction, appears in "Made You Look" and "'03 Bonnie and Clyde".
 Amy Vaughn, played by Pell James, Jules' mother, appears in "Shook Ones Pt. II" and "Fuck Anyone Who's Not a Sea Blob".
 Luke Kasten, played by Will Peltz, a notoriously hung former East Highland student who hooks up with Kat, appears in "Shook Ones Pt. II".
 Sonia Perez, played by Elpidia Carrillo, Maddy's mother, an esthetician, appears in "'03 Bonnie and Clyde" and "And Salt the Earth Behind You".
 Officer Wilson, played by Larry Joe Campbell, appears in "'03 Bonnie and Clyde".
 Johnny_Unite_USA, played by Jeff Pope, a man with a small penis who pursues Kat as a financial dominatrix, appears in "Made You Look" and "'03 Bonnie and Clyde"
 Minako, played by Sean Martini, one of Cal's transgender hookups, appears in "'03 Bonnie and Clyde".
 Frederick McKay, played by Cranston Johnson, McKay's father, appears in "The Next Episode".
 Rick, played by Nat Faxon, Leslie's new boyfriend, appears in "The Trials and Tribulations of Trying to Pee While Depressed".
 TC, played by Bobbi Salvör Menuez, Jules' non-binary friend from the city, appears in "The Trials and Tribulations of Trying to Pee While Depressed".
 Anna, played by Quintessa Swindell, TC's pansexual friend who hooks up with Jules, appears in "The Trials and Tribulations of Trying to Pee While Depressed".
 Natalie, played by Allie Marie Evans, Nate's winter formal date, appears in "And Salt the Earth Behind You".
 Dr. Mardy Nichols, played by Lauren Weedman, Jules' therapist, appears in "Fuck Anyone Who's Not a Sea Blob".
 "Tyler", played by Jayden Marcos, Jules' fantasy, appears in "Fuck Anyone Who's Not a Sea Blob".
 Bowl-Cut, played by Andy Mackenzie, a drug dealer who rips off Fez’s grandma, appears in "Trying to Get to Heaven Before They Close the Door".
 Bruce Jr., a thug who works for and is likely in a relationship with Laurie, played by Richie Merritt, appears in "Trying to Get to Heaven Before They Close the Door" and "Stand Still Like the Hummingbird".
 Travis, played by Demetrius "Lil Meech" Flenory Jr, DJ and producer who flirts with Maddy, appears in "Trying to Get to Heaven Before They Close the Door".
 Derek, played by Henry Eikenberry, Cal’s best friend in high school, appears in "Ruminations: Big and Little Bullys" and "You Who Cannot See, Think of Those Who Can".
 Jade, played by Aja Bair, the character in Lexi’s play based on Rue, appears in "The Theater and It’s Double" and "All My Life, My Heart Has Yearned for a Thing I Cannot Name".
 Hallie, played by Eden Rose, the character in Lexi’s play based on Cassie, appears in "The Theater and It’s Double" and "All My Life, My Heart Has Yearned for a Thing I Cannot Name".
 Rose also appears as an influencer in "Out of Touch".
 Marta, played by Izabella Alvarez, the character in Lexi’s play based on Maddy, appears in "The Theater and It’s Double" and "All My Life, My Heart Has Yearned for a Thing I Cannot Name".
 Luna, played by Isabella Amara, the character in Lexi’s play based on Kat, appears in "The Theater and It’s Double" and "All My Life, My Heart Has Yearned for a Thing I Cannot Name".

References

Euphoria (TV series)
Lists of American drama television series characters